Scorpion is a central processing unit (CPU) core designed by Qualcomm for use in their Snapdragon mobile systems on chips (SoCs). It was released in 2008. It was designed in-house, but has many architectural similarities with the ARM Cortex-A8 and Cortex-A9 CPU cores.

Overview
 10/12 stage integer pipeline with 2-way decode, 3-way out-of-order speculatively issued superscalar execution
 Pipelined VFPv3 and 128-bit wide NEON (SIMD)
 3 execution ports
 32 KB + 32 KB L1 cache
 256 KB (single-core) or 512 KB (dual-core) L2 cache
 Single or dual-core configuration
 2.1 DMIPS/MHz
 65/45/28 nm process

See also 
 Krait (CPU)
List of Qualcomm Snapdragon processors
Comparison of ARMv7-A cores
Adreno

References

ARM processors
Qualcomm IP cores